Since the 19th century, the United States government has participated and interfered, both overtly and covertly, in the replacement of many foreign governments. In the latter half of the 19th century, the U.S. government initiated actions for regime change mainly in Latin America and the southwest Pacific, including the Spanish–American and Philippine–American wars. At the onset of the 20th century, the United States shaped or installed governments in many countries around the world, including neighbors Panama, Honduras, Nicaragua, Mexico, Haiti, and the Dominican Republic.

During World War II, the United States helped overthrow many Nazi German or Imperial Japanese puppet regimes. Examples include regimes in the Philippines, Korea, East China, and parts of Europe. United States forces, together with the Soviet Union, were also instrumental in removing Adolf Hitler from power in Germany and Benito Mussolini in Italy.

In the aftermath of World War II, the U.S. government struggled with the Soviet Union for global leadership, influence and security within the context of the Cold War. Under the Eisenhower administration, the U.S. government feared that communism would be spread, sometimes with the assistance of the Soviet Union's own involvement in regime change, and promoted the domino theory, with later presidents following Eisenhower's precedent. Subsequently, the United States expanded the geographic scope of its actions beyond traditional area of operations, Central America and the Caribbean. Significant operations included the United States and United Kingdom-orchestrated 1953 Iranian coup d'état, the 1961 Bay of Pigs Invasion targeting Cuba, and support for the overthrow of Sukarno by General Suharto in Indonesia. In addition, the U.S. has interfered in the national elections of countries, including Italy in 1948, the Philippines in 1953, Japan in the 1950s and 1960s Lebanon in 1957, and Russia in 1996. According to one study, the U.S. performed at least 81 overt and covert known interventions in foreign elections during the period 1946–2000. According to another study, the U.S. engaged in 64 covert and six overt attempts at regime change during the Cold War.

Following the dissolution of the Soviet Union, the United States has led or supported wars to determine the governance of a number of countries. Stated U.S. aims in these conflicts have included fighting the War on Terror, as in the Afghan War, or removing weapons of mass destruction (WMDs), as in the Iraq War.

Prior to 1887

1846–1848 Annexation of Texas and invasion of California 

The United States annexed the Republic of Texas, at the time considered by Mexico to be a rebellious state of Mexico. During the war with Mexico that ensued, the United States seized Alta California from Mexico.

1865–1867: Mexico 

While the American Civil War was taking place in the United States, France and other countries invaded Mexico to collect debts. France then installed Habsburg prince Maximilian I as the Emperor of Mexico. After the Civil war ended, the United States began supporting the Liberal forces of Benito Juárez (who had been the interim President of Mexico since 1858 under the liberal Constitution of 1857 and then elected as president in 1861 before the French invasion) against the forces of Maximilian. The United States began sending and dropping arms into Mexico and many Americans fought alongside Juarez. Eventually, Juarez and the Liberals took back power and executed Maximillian I. The United States was against it and had invoked the Monroe Doctrine. William Seward said afterwards "The Monroe Doctrine, which eight years ago was merely a theory, is now an irreversible fact."

1887–1912: U.S. expansionism and Roosevelt administration

1880s

1887–1889: Samoa 

In the 1880s, Samoa was a monarchy with two rival claimants to the throne: Malietoa Laupepa and Mata'afa Iosefo. The Samoan crisis was a confrontation between the United States, Germany and the United Kingdom from 1887 to 1889, with the powers backing rival claimants to the throne of the Samoan Islands which became the First Samoan Civil War.

1890s

1893: Kingdom of Hawaii 

Anti-monarchs, mostly Americans, in Hawaii, engineered the overthrow of the Kingdom of Hawaii. On January 17, 1893, the native monarch, Queen Lili'uokalani, was overthrown. Hawaii was initially reconstituted as an independent republic, but the ultimate goal of the action was the annexation of the islands to the United States, which was finally accomplished with the Newlands Resolution of 1898.

1899–1902: Philippines 

The successful Philippine Revolution saw the defeat of the Spanish Empire and the establishment of the First Philippine Republic, ending centuries of Spanish colonial rule in the archipelago. The U.S., which had allied with the revolutionaries and emerged victorious in the concurrent Spanish–American War, was "granted" the Philippines in the Treaty of Paris. Wishing to establish its own control over the country, the U.S. engaged in the Philippine–American War, the success of which saw the dissolution of the self-governing Philippine Republic and formation of an Insular Government of the Philippine Islands in 1902. The Philippines became a self-governing Commonwealth in 1935 and was granted full sovereignty by 1946.

1900s

1903–1925: Honduras 

In what became known as the "Banana Wars," between the end of the Spanish–American War in 1898 and the inception of the Good Neighbor Policy in 1934, the U.S. staged many military invasions and interventions in Central America and the Caribbean. One of these incursions, in 1903, involved regime change rather than regime preservation. The United States Marine Corps, which most often fought these wars, developed a manual called The Strategy and Tactics of Small Wars in 1921 based on its experiences. On occasion, the Navy provided gunfire support and Army troops were also used. The United Fruit Company and Standard Fruit Company dominated Honduras' key banana export sector and associated land holdings and railways. The U.S. staged invasions and incursions of US troops in 1903 (supporting a coup by Manuel Bonilla), 1907 (supporting Bonilla against a Nicaraguan-backed coup), 1911 and 1912 (defending the regime of Miguel R. Davila from an uprising), 1919 (peacekeeping during a civil war, and installing the caretaker government of Francisco Bográn), 1920 (defending the Bográn regime from a general strike), 1924 (defending the regime of Rafael López Gutiérrez from an uprising) and 1925 (defending the elected government of Miguel Paz Barahona) to defend US interests.

1906–1909: Cuba 

After the explosion of the USS Maine the United States declared war on Spain, starting the Spanish–American War. The United States invaded and occupied Spanish-ruled Cuba in 1898. Many in the United States did not want to annex Cuba and passed the Teller Amendment, forbidding annexation. Cuba was occupied by the U.S. and run by military governor Leonard Wood during the first occupation from 1898 to 1902, after the end of the war. The Platt Amendment was passed later on outlining U.S. Cuban relations. It said the U.S. could intervene anytime against a government that was not approved, forced Cuba to accept U.S. influence, and limited Cuban abilities to make foreign relations. The United States forced Cuba to accept the terms of the Platt Amendment, by putting it into their constitution. After the occupation, Cuba and the U.S. would sign the Cuban–American Treaty of Relations in 1903, further agreeing to the terms of the Platt Amendment.

Tomás Estrada Palma became the first President of Cuba after the U.S. withdrew. He was a member of the Republican Party of Havana. He was re-elected in 1905 unopposed, however, the Liberals accused him of electoral fraud. Fighting began between the Liberals and Republicans. Due to the tensions he resigned on September 28, 1906, and his government collapsed soon afterwards. U.S. Secretary of State William Howard Taft invoked the Platt Amendment and the 1903 treaty, under approval of President Theodore Roosevelt, invading the country, and occupying it. The country would be governed by Charles Edward Magoon during the occupation. They oversaw the election of José Miguel Gómez in 1909, and afterwards withdrew from the country.

1909–1910: Nicaragua 

Governor Juan José Estrada, member of the Conservative Party, led a revolt against President José Santos Zelaya, member of the Liberal Party reelected in 1906. This became what is known as the Estrada rebellion. The United States supported the conservative forces because Zelaya had wanted to work with Germany or Japan to build a new canal through the country. The U.S. controlled the Panama Canal and did not want competition from another country outside of the Americas. Thomas P Moffat, a US council in Bluefields, Nicaragua would give overt support, in conflict with the US trying to only give covert support. Direct intervention would be pushed by the secretary of state Philander C. Knox. Two Americans were executed by Zelaya for their participation with the conservatives. Seeing an opportunity the United States became directly involved in the rebellion and sent in troops, which landed on the Mosquito Coast. On December 14, 1909 Zelaya was forced to resign under diplomatic pressure from America and fled Nicaragua. Before Zelaya fled, he along with the liberal assembly choose José Madriz to lead Nicaragua. The U.S. refused to recognize Madriz. The conservatives eventually beat back the liberals and forced Madriz to resign. Estrada then became the president. Thomas Cleland Dawson was sent as a special agent to the country and determined that any election held would bring the liberals into power, so had Estrada set up a constituent assembly to elect him instead. In August 1910 Estrada became President of Nicaragua under U.S. recognition, agreeing to certain conditions from the U.S. After the intervention, the U.S. and Nicaragua signed a treaty on June 6, 1911.

1912–1941: Wilson administration, World War I and interwar period

1910s

1912–1933: Nicaragua 

The Taft administration sent troops into Nicaragua and occupied the country. When the Wilson administration came into power, they extended the stay and took complete financial and governmental control of the country, leaving a heavily armed legation. U.S. president Calvin Coolidge removed troops from the country, leaving a legation and Adolfo Diaz in charge of the country. Rebels ended up capturing the town with the legation and Diaz requested troops came back, which they did a few months after leaving. The U.S. government fought against rebels led by Augusto Cesar Sandino. Franklin D. Roosevelt pulled out because the U.S. could no longer afford to keep troops in the country due to the Great Depression. The second intervention in Nicaragua would become one of the longest wars in United States history. The United States left the Somoza family in charge, who killed Sandino in 1934.

1915–1934: Haiti 

The U.S. occupied Haiti from 1915 to 1934. U.S.-based banks had lent money to Haiti and the banks requested U.S. government intervention. In an example of "gunboat diplomacy," the U.S. sent its navy to intimidate to get its way. Eventually, in 1917, the U.S. installed a new government and dictated the terms of a new Haitian constitution of 1917 that instituted changes that included an end to the prior ban on land ownership by non-Haitians. The Cacos were originally armed militias of formerly enslaved persons who rebelled and took control of mountainous areas following the Haitian Revolution in 1804. Such groups fought a guerrilla war against the U.S. occupation in what were known as the "Caco Wars."

1916–1924: Dominican Republic 

U.S. marines invaded the Dominican Republic and occupied it from 1916 to 1924, and this was preceded by US military interventions in 1903, 1904, and 1914. The US Navy installed its personnel in all key positions in government and controlled the Dominican military and police. Within a couple of days, President Juan Isidro Jimenes resigned.

1917: Costa Rica 

Costa Rica was the only country in Latin America that never had a long lasting authoritarian government in the 20th century. Its only dictatorship during the period was after the 1917 Costa Rican coup d'état led by Minister of War Federico Tinoco Granados against President Alfredo González Flores after González attempted to increase tax on the wealthy, and it lasted only two years. The US government led by Democratic President Woodrow Wilson did not recognize Tinoco's rule and helped the opposition that quickly overthrew Tinoco after a few months of warfare.

World War I

1917–1919: Germany 
After the release of the Zimmermann Telegram the United States joined the First World War on April 6, 1917, declaring war on the German Empire, a monarchy. The Wilson Administration made a requirement of surrender be the abdication of the Kaiser and the creation of a German Republic. Woodrow Wilson had made U.S. policy to "Make the World Safe for Democracy". Germany surrendered November 11, 1918. Kaiser Wilhelm II abdicated on November 28, 1918. While the United States did not ratify it, the Treaty of Versailles in 1919 had much input from the United States. It mandated for Kaiser Wilhelm II to be removed from the government and tried, though the second part was never carried out. Germany would then become the Weimar Republic, a liberal democracy. The United States signed the U.S.-German peace Treaty in 1921, solidifying the agreements made previously to the rest of the Entente with the U.S.

1917–1920: Austria-Hungary 

On December 7, 1917, the United States declared war on Austria-Hungary, a monarchy, as part of World War I. Austria-Hungary surrendered on November 3, 1918. Austria became a republic and signed Treaty of Saint Germain in 1919 effectively dissolving Austria-Hungary. The Treaty disallowed Austria to ever unite with Germany. Even though the United States had much effect on the treaty it did not ratify it and instead signed the U.S.-Austrian Peace Treaty in 1921, solidifying their new borders and government to the United States. After brief civil strife, the Kingdom of Hungary became a monarchy without a monarch, instead governed by Miklós Horthy as Regent. Hungary signed the Treaty of Trianon, in 1920 with the Entente, without the United States. They signed the U.S.-Hungarian Peace Treaty in 1921 solidifying their status and borders with the United States.

1918–1920: Russia 

In 1918 the U.S. military took part in the Allied intervention in the Russian Civil War to support White movement and overthrow the Bolsheviks. President Wilson agreed to send 5,000 United States Army troops in the campaign. This force, which became known as the "American North Russia Expeditionary Force" (a.k.a. the Polar Bear Expedition) launched the North Russia Campaign from Arkhangelsk, while another 8,000 soldiers, organised as the American Expeditionary Force Siberia, launched the Siberia intervention from Vladivostok. The forces were withdrawn in 1920.

1941–1945: World War II and aftermath

1940s

1941–1952: Japan 

In December 1941, the US joined the Allies in war against the Empire of Japan, a monarchy. After the Allied victory, Japan was occupied by Allied forces under the command of American general Douglas MacArthur. In 1946, the Japanese Diet ratified a new Constitution of Japan that followed closely a 'model copy' prepared by MacArthur's command, and was promulgated as an amendment to the old Prussian-style Meiji Constitution. The constitution renounced aggressive war and was accompanied by liberalization of many areas of Japanese life. While liberalizing life for most Japanese, the Allies tried many Japanese war criminals and executed some, while granting amnesty to the family of Emperor Hirohito. The occupation was ended by the Treaty of San Francisco.

Following the United States invasion of Okinawa during the Pacific War, the U.S. installed the United States Military Government of the Ryukyu Islands. Pursuant to a treaty with the Japanese government (Message of Emperor), in 1950 the United States Civil Administration of the Ryukyu Islands took over and ruled Okinawa and the rest of the Ryukyu Islands until 1972. During this "trusteeship rule," the U.S. built numerous military bases, including bases that operated nuclear weapons. U.S. rule was opposed by many local residents, creating the Ryukyu independence movement that struggled against U.S. rule.

1941–1949: Germany 

In December 1941, the United States joined the Allied campaign against Nazi Germany, a fascist dictatorship. The US took part in the Allied occcupation and Denazification of the Western portion of Germany. Former Nazis were subjected to varying levels of punishment, depending on how the US assessed their levels of guilt. US general Dwight D. Eisenhower initially estimated that the process would take 50 years. Depending on a former Nazi's level of culpability, punishments could range from a fine (for those judged least culpable), to denial of permission to work as anything but a manual laborer, to imprisonment and even death for the most severe offenders, such as those convicted in the Nuremberg Trials. At the end of 1947, for example, the Allies held 90,000 Nazis in detention; another 1,900,000 were forbidden to work as anything but manual laborers.

As Germans took more and more responsibility for Germany, they pushed for an end to the denazification process, and the Americans allowed this. In 1949, an independent liberal democracy, the Federal Republic of Germany, also known as West Germany, was formed and took responsibility for denazification. For most former Nazis, the process came to an end with amnesty laws passed in 1951. The ultimate outcome of denazification was the creation of a parliamentary democracy in West Germany.

1941–1946: Italy 

In July–August 1943, the US participated in the Allied invasion of Sicily, spearheaded by the U.S. Seventh Army, under Lieutenant General George S. Patton, in which over 2000 US servicemen were killed, initiating the Italian Campaign which conquered Italy from the fascist regime of Benito Mussolini and its Nazi German allies. Mussolini was arrested by order of King Victor Emmanuel III, provoking a civil war. The king appointed Pietro Badoglio as new Prime Minister. Badoglio stripped away the final elements of Fascist rule by banning the National Fascist Party, then signed an armistice with the Allied armed forces. The Royal Italian Army outside of the peninsula itself collapsed, its occupied and annexed territories fell under German control. Italy capitulated to the Allies on 3 September 1943. The northern half of the country was occupied by the Germans with help from Italian fascists and made a collaborationist puppet state, while the south was governed by monarchist forces, which fought for the Allied cause as the Italian Co-Belligerent Army.

1944–1946: France 

British, Canadian and United States forces were critical participants in Operation Goodwood and Operation Cobra, leading to a military breakout that ended the Nazi occupation of France. The actual Liberation of Paris was accomplished by French forces. The French formed the Provisional Government of the French Republic in 1944, leading to the formation of the French Fourth Republic in 1946.

The liberation of France is celebrated regularly up to the present day.

1944–1945: Belgium 

In the wake of the 1940 invasion, Germany established the Reichskommissariat of Belgium and Northern France to govern Belgium. United States, Canadian, British, and other Allied forces ended the Nazi occupation of most of Belgium in September 1944. The Belgian Government in Exile under Prime Minister Hubert Pierlot returned on 8 September.

In December, American forces suffered over 80,000 casualties defending Belgium from a German counterattack in the Battle of the Bulge. By February 1945, all of Belgium was in Allied hands.

The year 1945 was chaotic. Pierlot resigned, and Achille Van Acker of the Belgian Socialist Party formed a new government. There were riots over the Royal Question—the return of King Leopold III. Although the war continued, Belgians were again in control of their own country.

1944–1945: Netherlands 

During the Nazi occupation, the Netherlands was governed by the Reichskommissariat Niederlande, headed by Arthur Seyss-Inquart. British, Canadian, and American forces liberated portions of the Netherlands in September 1944. However, after the failure of Operation Market Garden, the liberation of the largest cities had to wait until the last weeks of the European theatre of World War II. The occupied portions of the Netherlands suffered a famine that winter. British and American forces crossed the Rhine on 23 March 1945; Canadian forces in their wake then entered the Netherlands from the east. The remaining German forces in the Netherlands surrendered on 5 May, which is celebrated as Liberation Day in the Netherlands. Queen Wilhelmina returned on 2 May; elections were held in 1946, leading to a new government headed by Prime Minister Louis Beel.

1944–1945: Philippines 

United States landings in 1944 ended the Japanese occupation of the Philippines. After the Japanese were defeated, the United States fulfilled a promise by granting independence to the Philippines. Sergio Osmeña formed the government of the restored Commonwealth of the Philippines, overseeing democratic transition to the fully sovereign Third Philippine Republic in 1946.

1945–1955: Austria 

Austria was annexed to Germany in the 1938 Anschluss. As German citizens, many Austrians fought on the side of Germany during World War II. After the Allied victory, the Allies treated Austria as a victim of Nazi aggression, rather than as a perpetrator. The United States Marshall Plan provided aid.

The 1955 Austrian State Treaty re-established Austria as a free, democratic, and sovereign state. It was signed by representatives of the United States, the Soviet Union, the United Kingdom, and France. It provided for the withdrawal of all occupying troops and guaranteed Austrian neutrality in the Cold War.

1945–1991: Cold War

1940s

1945–1948: South Korea 

The Empire of Japan surrendered to the United States in August 1945, ending the Japanese rule of Korea. Under the leadership of Lyuh Woon-Hyung People's Committees throughout Korea formed to coordinate transition to Korean independence. On August 28, 1945 these committees formed the temporary national government of Korea, naming it the People's Republic of Korea (PRK) a couple of weeks later. On September 8, 1945, the United States government landed forces in Korea and thereafter established the United States Army Military Government in Korea (USAMGK) to govern Korea south of the 38th parallel north. The USAMGK outlawed the PRK government.

In May 1948, Syngman Rhee, who had previously lived in the United States, won the 1948 South Korean presidential election, which had been boycotted by most other politicians and in which voting was limited to property owners and tax payers or, in smaller towns, to town elders voting for everyone else. Syngman Rhee, backed by the U.S. government, set up authoritarian rule that coordinated closely with the business sector and lasted until Rhee's overthrow in 1961, which led to a similarly authoritarian regime that would last ultimately until the late 1980s.

1945–1949: China 

The U.S. government provided military, logistical and other aid to the National Revolutionary Army led by Chiang Kai-shek's Nationalist government in its civil war against the indigenous communist People's Liberation Army (PLA) led by Mao Zedong. Both the KMT and the PLA were fighting against Japanese occupation forces, until the Japanese surrender to the United States in August 1945. This surrender brought to an end the Japanese Puppet state of Manchukuo and the Japanese-dominated Wang Jingwei regime.

After the Japanese surrender, the US continued to support the KMT against the PLA. The US airlifted many KMT troops from central China to Manchuria. Approximately 50,000 U.S. troops were sent to guard strategic sites in Hubei and Shandong. The U.S. trained and equipped KMT troops, and also transported Korean troops and even Imperial Japanese Army troops back to help KMT forces fight, and ultimately lose, against the People's Liberation Army. President Harry Truman justified deploying the very Japanese occupying army under whose boot the Chinese people had suffered so terribly to fight against the Chinese communists in this way: "It was perfectly clear to us that if we told the Japanese to lay down their arms immediately and march to the seaboard, the entire country would be taken over by the Communists. We therefore had to take the unusual step of using the enemy as a garrison until we could airlift Chinese National troops to South China and send Marines to guard the seaports." Within less than two years after the Second Sino-Japanese War, the KMT had received $4.43 billion from the United States—most of which was military aid.

1947–1949: Greece 

Greece had been under Axis occupation since 1941. Its government-in-exile, unelected and loyal to King George II, was based in Cairo. By the Summer of 1944, communist guerrillas, then known as the Greek People's Liberation Army (ELAS), who had been armed by the Western powers, exploiting the gradual collapse of the Axis, claimed to have liberated nearly all of Greece outside of Athens from Axis occupation, while also attacking and defeating rival non-Communist partisan groups, forming a rival unelected government, the Political Committee of National Liberation. On 12 August 1944, German forces retreated from the Athens area two days ahead of British landings there, ending the occupation.

The British Armed Forces together with Greek forces under control of the Greek government (now a government of national unity led by Konstantinos Tsaldaris, elected in the 1946 Greek legislative election boycotted by the Communist Party of Greece) then fought for control of the country in the Greek Civil War against the communists, who at that time were self-proclaimed as the Democratic Army of Greece (DSE). By early 1947, the British government could no longer afford the huge cost of financing the war against DSE, and pursuant to the October 1944 Percentages Agreement between Winston Churchill and Joseph Stalin, Greece was to remain part of the Western sphere of influence. Accordingly, the British requested the US government to step in and the U.S. flooded the country with military equipment, military advisers and weapons. With increased U.S. military aid, by September 1949 the government eventually won, fully restoring the Kingdom of Greece.

1948: Costa Rica 

Christian socialist medic Rafael Ángel Calderón Guardia of the National Republican Party reached power through democratic means in 1944, promoting a general social reform and allied to the Costa Rican Communist Party. Tensions between government and the opposition, supported by the CIA, caused the short-lived Costa Rican Civil War of 1948 that ended Calderón's government and led to the short de facto rule of 18 months by José Figueres Ferrer. However, Figueres also held some left-leaning ideas and continued the process of social reform. After the war, democracy was quickly restored and a two-party system encompassed by the parties of the Calderonistas and Figueristas developed in the country for nearly 60 years.

1949–1953: Albania 

Albania was in chaos after World War II and the country was not as focused on peacetime conferences in comparison to other European nations, while having suffered high casualties. It was threatened by its larger neighbors with annexation. After Yugoslavia dropped out of the Eastern Bloc, the small country of Albania was geographically isolated from the rest of the Eastern Bloc. The United States and United Kingdom took advantage of the situation and recruited anti-communist Albanians who had fled after the USSR invaded. The US and UK formed the Free Albania National Committee, made up of many of the emigres. Albanians, recruited, were trained by the U.S. and UK., infiltrated the country, multiple times. Eventually, the operation was found out and many of the agents fled, were executed, or were tried. The operation would become a failure. The operation was declassified in 2006, due to the Nazi War Crimes Disclosure Act and is now available in the National Archives.

1949: Syria 

The government of Shukri al-Quwatli, reelected in 1948, was overthrown by a junta led by the Syrian Army chief of staff at the time, Husni al-Za'im, who became President of Syria on April 11, 1949. Za'im had extensive connections to CIA operatives, although the exact nature of U.S. involvement in the coup remains highly controversial. The construction of the Trans-Arabian Pipeline, which had been held up in the Syrian parliament, was approved by Za'im, the new president, just over a month after the coup.

1950s

1950–1953: Burma and China 

The Chinese Civil War had recently ended, with the communists winning and the nationalists losing. The nationalists retreated to areas such as Taiwan and north Burma.

In Operation Paper, which began in late 1950 or early 1951 following Chinese involvement in the Korean War, 

Operation Paper entailed CIA plans used by CIA military advisors on the ground in Burma to assist Kuomintang incursions into Western China over several years, under the command of General Li Mi, with Kuomintang leadership hoping to eventually retake China, despite opposition from the US State Department. However, each attempted invasion was repelled by the Chinese army. The Kuomintang took control of large swaths of Burma, while the government of Burma complained repeatedly of the military invasion to the United Nations.

On secret flights from Thailand to Burma, CAT aircraft flown by pilots hired by the CIA brought American weapons and other supplies to the Kuomintang and on return flights the CAT aircraft transported opium from the Kuomintang to Chinese organized crime drug traffickers in Bangkok, Thailand.

1952: Egypt 

In February 1952, following January's riots in Cairo amid widespread nationalist discontent over the continued British occupation of the Suez Canal and Egypt's defeat in the 1948 Arab–Israeli War, CIA officer Kermit Roosevelt Jr. was dispatched by the State Department to meet with Farouk I of the Kingdom of Egypt. American policy at that time was to convince Farouk to introduce reforms that would weaken the appeal of Egyptian radicals and stabilize Farouk's grip on power. The U.S. was notified in advance of the successful July coup led by nationalist and anti-communist Egyptian military officers (the "Free Officers") that replaced the Egyptian monarchy with the Republic of Egypt under the leadership of Mohamed Naguib and Gamal Abdel Nasser. CIA officer Miles Copeland Jr. recounted in his memoirs that Roosevelt helped coordinate the coup during three prior meetings with the plotters (including Nasser, the future Egyptian president); this has not been confirmed by declassified documents but is partially supported by circumstantial evidence. Roosevelt and several of the Egyptians said to have been present in these meetings denied Copeland's account; another U.S. official, William Lakeland, said its veracity is open to question. Hugh Wilford notes that "whether or not the CIA dealt directly with the Free Officers prior to their July 1952 coup, there was extensive secret American-Egyptian contact in the months after the revolution."

1952: Guatemala 

Operation PBFortune, also known as Operation Fortune, was a covert United States operation to overthrow Guatemalan President Jacobo Árbenz in 1952. The operation was authorized by U.S. President Harry Truman and planned by the Central Intelligence Agency. The plan involved providing weapons to the exiled Guatemalan military officer Carlos Castillo Armas, who was to lead an invasion from Nicaragua.

1952–1953: Iran 

Since 1944, Iran was a constitutional monarchy ruled by the Shah Mohammad Reza Pahlavi. From the discovery of oil in Iran in the late nineteenth century major powers exploited the weakness of the Iranian government to obtain concessions that many believed failed to give Iran a fair share of the profits. During World War II, the UK, the USSR and the US all became involved in Iranian affairs, including the joint Anglo-Soviet invasion of Iran in 1941. Iranian officials began to notice that British taxes were increasing while royalties to Iran declined. By 1948, Britain received substantially more revenue from the Anglo-Iranian Oil Company (AIOC) than Iran. Negotiations to meet this and other Iranian concerns exacerbated rather than eased tensions.

On March 15, 1951 the Majlis, the Iranian parliament, passed legislation championed by reformist politician Mohammad Mosaddegh to nationalize the AIOC. The senate approved the measure two days later. Fifteen months later, Mosadegh was elected Prime Minister by the Majlis. International business concerns then boycotted oil from the nationalized Iranian oil industry. This contributed to concerns in Britain and the US that Mosadegh might be a communist. He was reportedly supported by the Communist Tudeh Party.

The CIA began supporting 18 of their favorite candidates in the 1952 Iranian legislative election, which Mosaddegh suspended after urban deputies loyal to him were elected. The new parliament gave Mosaddegh emergency powers which weakened the power of the Shah, and there was a constitutional struggle over the roles of the Shah and prime minister. Britain strongly backed the Shah, while the US officially remained neutral. However, America's position shifted in late 1952 with the election of Dwight D. Eisenhower as U.S. president. The CIA launched Operation Ajax, directed by Kermit Roosevelt Jr., with help from Norman Darbyshire, to remove Mosaddegh by persuading the Shah to replace him, using diplomacy and bribery. The 1953 Iranian coup d'état (known in Iran as the "28 Mordad coup") was orchestrated by the intelligence agencies of the United Kingdom such as MI6 (under the name "Operation Boot") and the United States (under the name "TPAJAX Project"). 

The coup saw the transition of Pahlavi from a constitutional monarch to an authoritarian, who relied heavily on United States government support. That support dissipated during the Iranian Revolution of 1979, as his own security forces refused to shoot into non-violent crowds. The CIA did not admit its responsibility until the 60th anniversary of the coup in August 2013.

1954: Guatemala 

In a 1954 CIA operation code named Operation PBSuccess, the U.S. government executed a coup that successfully overthrew the government of President Jacobo Árbenz, elected in 1950, and installed Carlos Castillo Armas, the first of a line of right-wing dictators, in its place. Not only was it done for the ideological purpose of containment, but the CIA had been approached by the United Fruit Company as it saw possible loss in profits due to the situation of workers in the country, i.e. the introduction of anti-exploitation laws. The perceived success of the operation made it a model for future CIA operations because the CIA lied to the president of the United States when briefing him regarding the number of casualties.

1956–1957: Syria 

In 1956 Operation Straggle was a failed coup plot against  Nasserist civilian politician Sabri al-Asali. The CIA made plans for a coup for late October 1956 to topple the Syrian government. The plan entailed takeover by the Syrian military of key cities and border crossings. The plan was postponed when Israel invaded Egypt in October 1956 and US planners thought their operation would be unsuccessful at a time when the Arab world is fighting "Israeli aggression." The operation was uncovered and American plotters had to flee the country.

In 1957 Operation Wappen was a second coup plan against Syria, orchestrated by the CIA's Kermit Roosevelt. It called for assassination of key senior Syrian officials, staged military incidents on the Syrian border to be blamed on Syria and then to be used as pretext for invasion by Iraqi and Jordanian troops, an intense US propaganda campaign targeting the Syrian population, and "sabotage, national conspiracies and various strong-arm activities" to be blamed on Damascus. This operation failed when Syrian military officers paid off with millions of dollars in bribes to carry out the coup revealed the plot to Syrian intelligence. The U.S. Department of State denied accusation of a coup attempt and along with US media accused Syria of being a "satellite" of the USSR.

There was also a third plan in 1957, called "The Preferred Plan". Alongside Britain's MI6, the CIA planned to support and arm several uprisings. However, this plan was never carried out.

1957–1959: Indonesia 

Starting in 1957, Eisenhower ordered the CIA to overthrow Sukarno. The CIA supported the failed Permesta Rebellion by rebel Indonesian military officers in February 1958. CIA pilots, such as Allen Lawrence Pope, piloted planes operated by CIA front organization Civil Air Transport (CAT) that bombed civilian and military targets in Indonesia. The CIA instructed CAT pilots to target commercial shipping in order to frighten foreign merchant ships away from Indonesian waters, thereby weakening the Indonesian economy and thus destabilizing the government of Indonesia. The CIA aerial bombardment resulted in the sinking of several commercial ships and the bombing of a marketplace that killed many civilians. Pope was shot down and captured on 18 May 1958, revealing U.S. involvement, which Eisenhower publicly denied at the time. The rebellion was ultimately defeated by 1961.

1959–1963: South Vietnam 

In 1959 a branch of the Worker's Party of Vietnam was formed in the south of the country and began an insurgency against the Republic of Vietnam. They were supplied through Group 559, which was formed the same year by North Vietnam to send weapons down the Ho Chi Minh Trail. The US supported the RoV against the communists. After the 1960 US election, President John F. Kennedy became much more involved with the fight against the insurgency. 

From mid-1963, the Kennedy administration became increasingly frustrated with South Vietnamese President Ngo Dinh Diem's corrupt and repressive rule and his persecution of the Buddhist majority. In light of Diem's refusal to adopt reforms, American officials debated whether they should support efforts to replace him. These debates crystallized after the ARVN Special Forces, which took their orders directly from the palace, raided Buddhist temples across the country, leaving a death toll estimated in the hundreds, and resulted in the dispatch of Cable 243 on August 24, 1963, which instructed United States Ambassador to South Vietnam, Henry Cabot Lodge Jr., to "examine all possible alternative leadership and make detailed plans as to how we might bring about Diem's replacement if this should become necessary". Lodge and his liaison officer, Lucien Conein, contacted discontented Army of the Republic of Vietnam officers and gave assurances that the US would not oppose a coup or respond with aid cuts. These efforts culminated in a coup d'état on November 1–2, 1963, during which Diem and his brother were assassinated. By the end of 1963 the Viet Cong switched to a much more aggressive strategy in fighting the Southern government and the US.

The Pentagon Papers concluded that "Beginning in August of 1963 we variously authorized, sanctioned and encouraged the coup efforts of the Vietnamese generals and offered full support for a successor government. In October we cut off aid to Diem in a direct rebuff, giving a green light to the generals. We maintained clandestine contact with them throughout the planning and execution of the coup and sought to review their operational plans and proposed new government."

1959–1962: Cuba 

General Fulgencio Batista was a military dictator who seized power in Cuba in March 1952 and was backed by the U.S. government until March 1958. His regime was overthrown on December 31, 1958, thus bringing an end to the Cuban Revolution that was led by Fidel Castro and his 26th of July Movement. Castro became President in February 1959. The CIA backed a force composed of CIA-trained Cuban exiles to invade Cuba with support and equipment from the US military, in an attempt to overthrow Castro's government. The invasion was launched in April 1961, three months after John F. Kennedy assumed the presidency in the United States, but the Cuban armed forces defeated the invading combatants within three days.

Operation MONGOOSE was a year-long U.S. government effort to overthrow the government of Cuba. The operation included economic warfare, including an embargo against Cuba, "to induce failure of the Communist regime to supply Cuba's economic needs", a diplomatic initiative to isolate Cuba, and psychological operations "to turn the peoples' resentment increasingly against the regime." The economic warfare prong of the operation also included the infiltration of CIA operatives to carry out many acts of sabotage against civilian targets, such as a railway bridge, a molasses storage facilities, an electric power plant, and the sugar harvest, notwithstanding Cuba's repeated requests to the United States government to cease its armed operations. In addition, the CIA planned a number of assassination attempts against Fidel Castro, head of government of Cuba, including attempts that entailed CIA collaboration with the American mafia. In April 2021, documents released by the National Security Archive showed that the CIA was also involved in a plot to assassinate Raúl Castro in 1960.

Having first imposed an embargo on the sale of arms to Cuba in March 1958, during the Batista dictatorship, Eisenhower imposed further sanctions on October 19, 1960, after Cuba nationalized the U.S.-owned Cuban oil refineries without compensation. This new embargo resulted in all exports to Cuba other than food and medicine being blocked from getting onto the island. On February 7, 1962, Kennedy extended the embargo to include almost all exports, which continues to this day. Donald Trump added more than two hundred sanctions during his administration, and reclassified the country as a state sponsor of terrorism shortly before leaving office in January 2021, overturning a move by his predecessor, Barack Obama, in May 2015.

The United Nations General Assembly has passed a resolution every year since 1992 demanding an end to the embargo, with the US and Israel being the only nations to consistently vote against the resolutions.

1960s

1960–1965: Congo-Leopoldville 

Patrice Lumumba was elected the first Prime Minister of the Republic of the Congo, now the Democratic Republic of the Congo, in May 1960, and in June 1960, the country achieved full independence from Belgium. In July, the Congo Crisis erupted with a mutiny among army, followed by the regions Katanga and South Kasai succeeding with support from Belgium, who wished to keep power over resources in the region. Lumumba called in the United Nations to help him, but the U.N. force only agreed to keep peace and not stop the separatist movements. Lumumba then agreed to receive help from the USSR in order to stop the separatists, worrying the United States, due to the supply of uranium in the country. At first, The Eisenhower Administration planned to poison him with his toothpaste, but this was abandoned. The CIA sent official Sydney Gottlieb with a poison to liaison with an African CIA asset code-named WI/Rogue who was to assassinate Lumumba, but Lumumba went into hiding before the operation was completed. The United States encouraged Mobutu Sese Seko, a colonel in the army, to overthrow him, which he did on September 14, 1960. After being locked in prison, Mobutu sent him to Katanga, and he was executed soon after on January 17, 1961.

After Lumumba was killed, the US began funding Mobutu in order to secure him against the separatists and opposition. Many of Lumumba's supporters went east and formed the Free Republic of the Congo with its capital in Stanleyville in opposition to Mobutu's government.  Eventually, the government in Stanleyville agreed to rejoin with the Leopoldville government under the latter's rule, however in 1963, Lumumba supporters formed another separate government in the east of the country and launched the Simba rebellion. The rebellion had support from the Soviet Union and many other countries in the Eastern Bloc. In November 1964, the U.S. and Belgium launched Operation Dragon Rouge to rescue hostages taken by Simba rebels in Stanleyville. The operation was a success and expelled the Simba rebels from the city, leaving them in disarray. The Simbas were ultimately defeated the following year by the Congolese army.

After the March 1965 elections, Mobutu Sese Seko launched a second coup in November with the support of the U.S. and other powers. Mobutu Sese Seko claimed democracy would return in five years and he was popular initially. However, he instead took increasingly authoritarian powers eventually becoming the dictator of the country.

1960: Laos 

On August 9, 1960, Captain Kong Le with his Royal Lao Army paratroop battalion seized control of the administrative capital city of Vientiane in a bloodless coup on a "neutralist" platform with the stated aims of ending the civil war raging in Laos, ending foreign interference in the country, ending the corruption caused by foreign aid, and better treatment for soldiers. With CIA support, Field Marshal Sarit Thanarat, the Prime Minister of Thailand, set up a covert Royal Thai Armed Forces advisory group, called Kaw Taw. Kaw Taw together with the CIA backed a November 1960 counter-coup against the new Neutralist government in Vientiane, supplying artillery, artillerymen, and advisers to General Phoumi Nosavan, first cousin of Sarit. It also deployed the Police Aerial Reinforcement Unit (PARU) to operations within Laos, sponsored by the CIA. With the help of CIA front organization Air America to airlift war supplies and with other U.S. military assistance and covert aid from Thailand, General Phoumi Nosavan's forces captured Vientiane in November 1960.

1961: Dominican Republic 

In May 1961, the ruler of the Dominican Republic, Rafael Trujillo was murdered with weapons supplied by the United States Central Intelligence Agency (CIA). An internal CIA memorandum states that a 1973 Office of Inspector General investigation into the murder disclosed "quite extensive Agency involvement with the plotters." The CIA described its role in "changing" the government of the Dominican Republic as a 'success' in that it assisted in moving the Dominican Republic from a totalitarian dictatorship to a Western-style democracy." Juan Bosch, an earlier recipient of CIA funding, was elected president of the Dominican Republic in 1962 and was deposed in 1963.

1963: Iraq 

Several sources, notably Said Aburish, have alleged that the February 1963 coup that resulted in the formation of a Ba'athist government in Iraq was "masterminded" by the CIA. No declassified U.S. documents have verified this allegation. However, senior National Security Council official Robert Komer wrote to President John F. Kennedy on February 8, 1963 that the Iraqi coup "is almost certainly a net gain for our side ... CIA had excellent reports on the plotting, but I doubt either they or UK should claim much credit for it." Brandon Wolfe-Hunnicutt states that "Scholars remain divided in their interpretations of American foreign policy toward the February 1963 coup in Iraq," but cites "compelling evidence of an American role in the coup."

Tareq Y. Ismael, Jacqueline S. Ismael, and Glenn E. Perry state that "Ba'thist forces and army officers overthrew Qasim on February 8, 1963, in collaboration with the CIA." Conversely, Bryan R. Gibson argues that "the preponderance of evidence substantiates the conclusion that the CIA was not behind the February 1963 Ba'thist coup." The U.S. offered material support to the new Ba'athist government after the coup, amidst an anti-communist purge and Iraqi atrocities against Kurdish rebels and civilians. Because of this, Nathan Citino asserts: "Although the United States did not initiate the 14 Ramadan coup, at best it condoned and at worst it contributed to the violence that followed." The Ba'athist government collapsed in November 1963 over the question of unification with Syria (where a rival branch of the Ba'ath Party had seized power in March).

There has been a great deal of academic discussion regarding allegations from King Hussein of Jordan and others that the CIA (or other U.S. agencies) provided the Ba'athist government with lists of communists and other leftists, who were then arrested or killed by the Ba'ath Party's militia—the National Guard. Gibson and Hanna Batatu emphasize that the identities of Iraqi Communist Party members were publicly known and that the Ba'ath would not have needed to rely on U.S. intelligence to identify them, whereas Citino considers the allegations plausible because the U.S. embassy in Iraq had actually compiled such lists, and because Iraqi National Guard members involved in the purge received training in the U.S.

1965–1967: Indonesia 

Junior army officers and the commander of the palace guard of President Sukarno accused senior Indonesian National Armed Forces brass of planning a CIA-backed coup against President Sukarno and killed six senior generals on October 1, 1965. General Suharto and other senior military officers attacked the junior officers on the same day and accused the Communist Party of Indonesia (PKI) of planning the killing of the six generals. The army launched a propaganda campaign based on lies and riled up civilian mobs to attack those believed to be PKI supporters and other political opponents. Indonesian government forces with collaboration of some civilians perpetrated mass killings over many months. Scholars estimate the number of civilians killed range from a half million to over a million. US Ambassador Marshall Green encouraged the military leaders to act forcefully against the political opponents.

In 2017, declassified documents from the U.S. Embassy in Jakarta have confirmed that the US had knowledge of, facilitated and encouraged mass killings for its own geopolitical interests. US diplomats admitted to journalist Kathy Kadane in 1990 that they had provided the Indonesian army with thousands of names of alleged PKI supporters and other alleged leftists, and that the U.S. officials then checked off from their lists those who had been murdered. President Sukarno's base of support was largely annihilated, imprisoned and the remainder terrified, and thus he was forced out of power in 1967, replaced by an authoritarian military regime led by General Suharto. Historian John Roosa states that "almost overnight the Indonesian government went from being a fierce voice for cold war neutrality and anti-imperialism to a quiet, compliant partner of the US world order." This campaign is considered a major turning point in the Cold War, and was such a success that it served as a model for other U.S.-backed coups and anti-communist extermination campaigns throughout Asia and Latin America.

1970s

1970: Cambodia 

Prince Norodom Sihanouk, who came to power by the 1955 parliamentary election, had for years kept Cambodia out of the Vietnam War by being friendly with China and North Vietnam, and had integrated left wing parties into mainstream politics. However, a leftist uprising occurred in 1967 and the communist Khmer Rouge began an insurgency against the prince the following year. Following the 1968 Tet Offensive, Sihanouk became convinced that North Vietnam was going to lose the war so he improved relations with the United States. Henry Kissinger suggested that Sihanouk approved U.S. bombing of North Vietnamese targets in Cambodia in 1969, although this has been heavily disputed by other sources.

In March 1970 Sihanouk was deposed by right-wing General Lon Nol following a vote of no confidence in Cambodia's National Assembly. The overthrow followed Cambodia's constitutional process and most accounts emphasize the primacy of Cambodian actors in Sihanouk's removal. Historians are divided about the extent of U.S. involvement in or foreknowledge of the ouster, but an emerging consensus posits some culpability on the part of U.S. military intelligence. There is evidence that "as early as late 1968" Lon Nol floated the idea of a coup to U.S. military intelligence to obtain U.S. consent and military support for action against Prince Sihanouk and his government. The coup further destabilized the country and ushered in years of civil war between the right-wing Khmer Republic backed by intensified U.S. bombing and Khmer Rouge forces backed by the People's Army of Vietnam. The communists eventually took Phnom Penh, winning the civil war and establishing Democratic Kampuchea.

1970–1973: Chile 

Between 1960 and 1969, the Soviet government funded the Communist Party of Chile at a rate of between $50,000 and $400,000 annually.

The U.S. government ran a psy ops action in Chile from 1963 until the coup d'état in 1973, and the CIA was involved in every Chilean election during that time. In the 1964 Chilean presidential election, the U.S. government supplied $2.6 million in funding to Christian Democratic Party presidential candidate Eduardo Frei Montalva, to prevent Salvador Allende and the Socialist Party of Chile winning. The U.S. also used the CIA to provide $12 million in funding to business interests for use in harming Allende's reputation. Kristian C. Gustafson wrote:
It was clear the Soviet Union was operating in Chile to ensure Marxist success, and from the contemporary American point of view, the United States was required to thwart this enemy influence: Soviet money and influence were clearly going into Chile to undermine its democracy, so U.S. funding would have to go into Chile to frustrate that pernicious influence.

Prior to Allende's inauguration, chief of staff of the Chilean Army, René Schneider, a general dedicated to preserving the constitutional order and considered "a major stumbling block for military officers seeking to carry out a coup", was targeted in a failed CIA backed kidnapping attempt by General Camilo Valenzuela on October 19, 1970. Schneider was killed three days later in another botched kidnapping attempt led by General Roberto Viaux. After the inauguration, there followed an extended period of social and political unrest between the right-dominated Congress of Chile and Allende, as well as economic warfare waged by Washington. U.S. President Richard Nixon had promised to "make the economy scream" to "prevent Allende from coming to power or to unseat him".

On September 11, 1973, President Allende was overthrown by the Chilean Armed Forces and National Police, bringing to power the regime of Augusto Pinochet. The CIA, through Project FUBELT (also known as Track II), worked secretly to prepare the conditions for the coup. While the U.S. initially denied any involvement, many relevant documents have been declassified in the decades since.

1971: Bolivia 

The U.S. government supported the 1971 coup led by General Hugo Banzer that toppled President Juan José Torres of Bolivia, who had himself come to power in a coup the previous year. Torres was kidnapped and assassinated in 1976 as part of Operation Condor, the U.S.-supported campaign of political repression and state terrorism by South American right-wing dictators.

1974–1991: Ethiopia 

On September 12, 1974 Emperor Haile Selassie I of the Ethiopian Empire, a dynastic monarchy, was overthrown in a coup by the Derg, an organization set up by the Emperor to investigate the Ethiopian Armed Forces. The Derg, led by dictator Mengistu Haile Mariam, became Marxist–Leninist and aligned with the Soviet Union. Numerous rebel groups rose up against the Derg, including conservative, separatist groups, and other Marxist–Leninist groups. These groups would receive support by the United States.

In the late 1980s, the rebels and the Eritrean separatists began to make gains against the government. The Derg dissolved itself in 1987, establishing the People's Democratic Republic of Ethiopia (PDRE) under the Workers' Party of Ethiopia (WPE) in an attempt to maintain its rule. In 1990 the USSR stopped supporting the Ethiopian government as it started to collapse, while the United States continued to support the rebels. In 1991 Mengistu Halie Mariam resigned and fled as rebels of the Ethiopian People's Revolutionary Democratic Front (EPRDF), a coalition of left-wing ethnic rebel groups, took over. Despite the fact that the US opposed him, the US embassy helped Mariam escape to Zimbabwe. The PDRE was dissolved and replaced with the Tigray People's Liberation Front-led Transitional Government of Ethiopia, and a transition to parliamentary democracy began.

1975–1991: Angola 

Beginning in the 1960s, a rebellion broke out against Portuguese colonial rule in the Angolan War of Independence, mainly involving rebel groups the People's Movement for the Liberation of Angola (MPLA) and the National Liberation Front of Angola (FNLA). In 1974, the right-wing military junta in Portugal was ousted in the Carnation Revolution. The new government promised to give independence to its colonies including Angola. On January 15, 1975, Portugal signed the Alvor Agreement giving independence to Angola and establishing a transitional government including the MPLA, FNLA and National Union for the Total Independence of Angola (UNITA). The transitional government consisted of the Portuguese High Commissioner, ruling with a Prime Ministerial Council (PMC) made up of three representatives, one from each Angolan party to the agreement, with a rotating premiership among the representatives.

However, the various independence groups started fighting one another. The MPLA was a leftist group that was advancing upon the other two main rebel groups, the FNLA and UNITA, the latter led by Jonas Savimbi, a former FNLA fighter and Maoist who eventually became a capitalist ideologically and made UNITA into a capitalist militant group.

The United States covertly supported UNITA and the FNLA through Operation IA Feature. President Gerald Ford approved of the program on July 18, 1975 while receiving dissent from officials in the CIA and State Department. Nathaniel Davis, Assistant Secretary of State, quit because of his disagreement with this. This program began as the war for independence was ending and continued as the civil war began in November 1975. The funding initially started at $6 million but then added $8 million on July 27 and added $25 million in August. The program was exposed and condemned by Congress in 1976. The Clark Amendment was added to the US Arms Export Control Act of 1976 ending the operation and restricting involvement in Angola. Despite this CIA Director George H.W. Bush conceded that some aid to the FNLA and UNITA continued. 

In 1986, Ronald Reagan articulated the Reagan Doctrine, which called for the funding of anti-Communist forces across the world to "roll back" Soviet influence. The Reagan Administration lobbied Congress to repeal the Clark Amendment, which eventually occurred on July 11, 1985. In 1986, the war in Angola became a major Cold War proxy conflict. Savimbi's conservative allies in the US lobbied for increased support to UNITA. In 1986 Savimbi visited the White House and afterwards Reagan approved the shipment of Stinger Surface-to-Air Missiles as a part of $25 Million in aid.

After George H.W. Bush became president, aid to Savimbi continued. Savimbi began relying on the company Black, Manafort, and Stone in order to lobby for assistance. They lobbied the H.W. Bush administration for increased assistance and weapons to UNITA. Savimbi also met with Bush himself in 1990. In 1991, the MPLA and UNITA signed the Bicesse Accords ending US and Soviet involvement in the war, initiating multi-party elections and establishing the Republic of Angola, while South Africa withdrew from Namibia.

1975–1999: East Timor 

On December 7, 1975, nine days after declaring independence from Portugal, East Timor was invaded by Indonesia. Whilst it was under the pretext of anti-colonialism, the actual aim of the invasion was to overthrow the Fretilin regime that emerged previous year. The day before the invasion, U.S. President Gerald Ford and Secretary of State, Henry Kissinger met with General Suharto, who told them of his intention to invade East Timor. Ford replied, "[W]e will understand and not press you on the issue. We understand the problem you have and the intentions you have." Ford endorsed the invasion as he saw East Timor as of little significance, overshadowed by Indonesia–United States relations. The fall of Saigon earlier in 1975 had left Indonesia as the most important U.S. ally in Southeast Asia, so Ford reasoned that it was in the national interest to side with Indonesia.

American weapons were crucial to Indonesia during the invasion, with the majority of military equipment used by Indonesian military units involved being U.S. supplied. United States military aid to Indonesia continued during its occupation of East Timor, which ended in 1999 with East Timor's independence referendum. In 2005, the final Commission for Reception, Truth and Reconciliation in East Timor wrote that "[U.S.] political and military support were fundamental to the invasion and occupation of East Timor".

1976: Argentina

The Argentine Armed Forces overthrew President Isabel Perón, elected in the 1973 presidential election, in the 1976 Argentine coup d'état, starting the military dictatorship of General Jorge Rafael Videla known as the National Reorganization Process until 1983. Both the coup and the following authoritarian regime were endorsed and supported by the U.S. government with Henry Kissinger paying several official visits to Argentina during the dictatorship. According to Spanish judge Baltasar Garzón, Kissinger was a witness to the regime's crimes against humanity.

1979–1992: Afghanistan 

In 1978, the Saur Revolution brought the Democratic Republic of Afghanistan to power, a one-party state backed by the Soviet Union. In what was known as Operation Cyclone, the U.S. government provided weapons and funding for a collection of warlords and several factions of jihadi guerrillas known as the Afghan mujahideen fighting to overthrow the Afghan government. The program began modestly with $695,000 in nominally "non-lethal" aid to the mujahideen on July 3, 1979 and escalated following the December 1979 Soviet invasion of Afghanistan. Through the Inter-Services Intelligence (ISI) of neighboring Pakistan the U.S. channeled training, weapons, and money for Afghan fighters. The first CIA-supplied weapons were antique British Lee–Enfield rifles shipped out in December 1979, but by September 1986 the program included U.S.-origin state of the art weaponry, such as FIM-92 Stinger surface-to-air missiles, some 2,300 of which were ultimately shipped into Afghanistan.

Afghan Arabs also "benefited indirectly from the CIA's funding, through the ISI and resistance organizations." Some of the CIA's greatest Afghan beneficiaries were Islamist commanders such as Jalaluddin Haqqani and Gulbuddin Hekmatyar, who were key allies of Osama bin Laden over many years. Some of the CIA-funded militants would become part of al-Qaeda later on, and included bin Laden, according to former Foreign Secretary Robin Cook and other sources. Despite these and similar allegations, there is no direct evidence of CIA contact with bin Laden or his inner circle during the Soviet–Afghan War.

U.S. support for the mujahideen ended in January 1992 pursuant to an agreement reached with the Soviets in September 1991 on ending external interference in Afghanistan by either side. By 1992, the combined U.S., Saudi, and Chinese aid to the mujahideen was estimated at $6–12 billion, whereas Soviet military aid to Afghanistan was valued at $36–48 billion. The result was a heavily armed, militarized Afghan society: Some sources indicate that Afghanistan was the world's top destination for personal weapons during the 1980s.

1980s

1980–1989: Poland 

Since the 1952 Constitution, Poland was a one-party Communist state, the Polish People's Republic. In the 1980s, opposition to it crystallised in the Solidarity trade union, founded in 1980. The Reagan administration supported the Solidarity, and—based on CIA intelligence—waged a public relations campaign to deter what the Carter administration felt was "an imminent move by large Soviet military forces into Poland." Michael Reisman and James E. Baker named operations in Poland as one of the covert actions of CIA during Cold War. Colonel Ryszard Kukliński, a senior officer on the Polish General Staff was secretly sending reports to the CIA. The CIA transferred around $2 million yearly in cash to Solidarity, for a total of $10 million over five years. There were no direct links between the CIA and Solidarność, and all money was channeled through third parties. CIA officers were barred from meeting Solidarity leaders, and the CIA's contacts with Solidarność activists were weaker than those of the AFL–CIO, which raised $300,000 from its members, which were used to provide material and cash directly to Solidarity, with no control of Solidarity's use of it. The U.S. Congress authorized the National Endowment for Democracy to promote democracy, and the NED allocated $10 million to Solidarity.

When the Polish government launched martial law in December 1981, however, Solidarity was not alerted. Potential explanations for this vary; some believe that the CIA was caught off guard, while others suggest that American policy-makers viewed an internal crackdown as preferable to an "inevitable Soviet intervention." CIA support for Solidarity included money, equipment and training, which was coordinated by Special Operations. Henry Hyde, U.S. House intelligence committee member, stated that the US provided "supplies and technical assistance in terms of clandestine newspapers, broadcasting, propaganda, money, organizational help and advice". Initial funds for covert actions by CIA were $2 million, but soon after authorization were increased and by 1985 CIA successfully infiltrated Poland.

1981–1982: Chad 

In 1975 as part of the First Chadian Civil War, the military overthrew François Tombalbaye and installed Félix Malloum as head of state. Hissène Habré was appointed Prime minister, and attempted to overthrow the government in February 1979, failing, and being forced out. In 1979 Malloum resigned and Goukouni Oueddei became head of state. Oueddei agreed to share power with Habre, appointing him Minister of Defense, but fighting resumed soon after. Habre was exiled to Sudan in 1980.

At the time the U.S. government wanted a bulwark against Muammar Gaddafi in Libya, and saw Chad, Libya's southern neighbor, as a good option. Chad and Libya had recently signed an agreement to attempt to end their border conflict and "to work to achieve full unity between the two countries", which the United States was against. The United States also saw Oueddei as too close to Gaddafi. Habre was already pro-western and pro-American, as well as against Oueddei. The Reagan administration gave him covert support through the CIA when he returned in 1981 to continue fighting, and he overthrow Goukouni Oueddi on June 7, 1982, making himself the new president of Chad.

The CIA continued to support Habre after he took power, including training and equipping the Documentation and Security Directorate (DDS), Chad's notorious secret police. They also supported 
Chad in their 1986–1987 war against Libya.

1981–1990: Nicaragua 

The FSLN (Sandinista National Liberation Front) had overthrown in 1979 the Somoza family, friendly with the US. At first the Carter administration tried to be friendly with the new government, but the Reagan administration that came after had a much more anti-communist foreign policy. Immediately in January 1981, Reagan cut off aid to the Nicaraguan government, and August 6, 1981 he signed National Security Decision Directive 7, authorizing the production and shipment of arms to the region but not their deployment. On November 17, 1981 Reagan signed National Security Directive 17, allowing covert support to anti-Sandinista forces. The U.S. government then secretly armed, trained and funded the Contras, a group of rebel fighters based in Honduras, in an attempt to overthrow the Nicaraguan government. As part of the training, the CIA distributed a detailed manual entitled "Psychological Operations in Guerrilla War," which instructed the Contras, among other things, on how to blow up public buildings, to assassinate judges, to create martyrs, and to blackmail ordinary citizens. In addition to backing the Contras, the U.S. government also blew up bridges and mined harbors, causing the damaging of at least seven merchant ships and blowing up numerous Nicaraguan fishing boats. They also attacked Corinto harbour, causing 112 wounded according to the Nicaraguan government.

After the Boland Amendment made it illegal for the U.S. government to provide funding for Contra activities, Reagan's administration secretly sold arms to the Iranian government to fund a secret U.S. government apparatus that continued illegally to fund the Contras, in what became known as the Iran–Contra affair. The U.S. continued to arm and train the Contras even after the Sandinista government of Nicaragua won the elections of 1984. In the 1990 Nicaraguan general election, the George H. W. Bush administration authorized 49.75 million dollars of non-lethal aid to the Contras. They continued to assassinate candidates and fight the war and distributed leaflets promoting the opposition party UNO (National Opposition Union), which won the election. The Contras ended fighting soon afterwards.

1983: Grenada 

On 25 October 1983, the U.S. military and a coalition of six Caribbean nations invaded the nation of Grenada, codenamed Operation Urgent Fury, and successfully overthrew the Marxist government of Hudson Austin which was backed by Cuban soldiers. The conflict was triggered by the killing of the previous leader of Grenada Maurice Bishop and the establishment of Hudson as the country's leader a week before on 19 October. The United Nations General Assembly called the U.S. invasion "a flagrant violation of international law" but a similar resolution widely supported in the United Nations Security Council was vetoed by the U.S.

1989–1994: Panama 

In 1979, the U.S. and Panama signed a treaty to end the Panama Canal Zone and promise that the U.S. would hand over the canal after 1999. Manuel Noriega ruled the country of Panama as dictator. He was an ally of the United States working with them against the Sandinistas in Nicaragua and the FMLN in El Salvador. Despite this, relations began to deteriorate as he was implicated in the Iran-Contra scandal, including drug trafficking. As relations continued to deteriorate Noriega started to ally with the Eastern Bloc. This also worried US officials and government officials like Elliott Abrams started arguing to Reagan that the US should invade Panama. Reagan decided to hold off due to George H. W. Bush's ties to Noriega when he was the head of the CIA running his election, but after Bush was elected he started pressuring Noriega. Despite irregularities in the 1989 Panamanian general election, Noriega refused to allow the opposition candidate into power. Bush called on him to honor the will of the Panamanian people. Coup attempts were made against Noriega and skirmishes broke out between U.S. and Panamanian troops. Noriega was also indicted for drug charges in the United States.

In December 1989, in a military operation code-named Operation Just Cause, the U.S. invaded Panama. Noriega went into hiding but was later captured by US forces. President-elect Guillermo Endara was sworn into office. The United States ended Operation Just Cause in January 1990 and began Operation Promote Liberty, which was the occupation of the country to set up the new government until 1994.

1991–present: Post-Cold War

1990s

1991: Iraq 

During and immediately following the Gulf War in 1991, the United States broadcast signals encouraging an uprising against Saddam Hussein, an autocrat who had ruled Iraq since coming to power in an internal struggle in the ruling Ba'ath Party in 1979. On February 5, 1991 President George H. W. Bush made a speech on Voice of America stating, "There is another way for the bloodshed to stop: and that is, for the Iraqi military and the Iraqi people to take matters into their own hands and force Saddam Hussein, the dictator, to step aside and then comply with the United Nations' resolutions and rejoin the family of peace-loving nations." On February 24, 1991 a few days after the ceasefire was signed the CIA funded and operated radio station Voice of Free Iraq called for the Iraqi people to rise up against Hussein. The day after the Gulf War ended on March 1, 1991, Bush again called for the overthrow of Saddam Hussein. The U.S. was hoping for a coup but instead, a series of uprisings erupted across Iraq right after the war. Two of the largest rebellions were led by the Iraqi Kurds in the North and the Shia militias in the south. The rebels assumed that they would be getting direct U.S. assistance, however United States never intended to give assistance to the rebels. The Shia uprisings were crushed by the Iraqi military while the Peshmerga were more successful, gaining the Iraqi Kurds autonomy. The Bush Administration faced heavy criticism for not assisting the rebels after encouraging them to rise up. The U.S. worried that if Saddam fell and Iraq collapsed, Iran would gain power. Colin Powell wrote of his time as Chairman of the Joint Chiefs of Staff "our practical intention was to leave Baghdad enough power to survive as a threat to an Iran that remained bitterly hostile toward the United States". At the same time George H.W. Bush said that the U.S. had never intended to assist anyone.

The United Nations Security Council (UNSC) originally imposed sanctions against Iraq in August 1990 under Resolution 661 to compel Iraq to withdraw from occupied Kuwait without the use of military force, but Iraq refused to withdraw its forces, leading to the 1991 Gulf War. After the war, the U.S. government successfully advocated that sanctions remain in effect with revisions, including linkage to removal of weapons of mass destruction, which the UNSC did in April 1991 by adopting Resolution 687, albeit with the earlier prohibition on foodstuffs lifted. U.S. officials stated in May 1991—when it was widely expected that the Iraqi government of Saddam Hussein faced collapse—that the sanctions would not be lifted unless Saddam was ousted. In the subsequent president's administration, U.S. officials did not explicitly insist on regime change but took the position that the sanctions could be lifted if Iraq complied with all of the UN resolutions it was violating (including those related to the country's human rights record) and not just with UN weapons inspections. The effects of the sanctions on the Iraqi civilian population, including the child mortality rate, were disputed at the time. Whereas it was widely believed at the time that the sanctions caused a major rise in child mortality, recent research has shown that commonly cited data were fabricated by the Iraqi government and that "there was no major rise in child mortality in Iraq after 1990 and during the period of the sanctions."

1991: Haiti 

Eight months after what was widely considered the first honest election held in Haiti, the newly elected President Jean-Bertrand Aristide was deposed by the Haitian Armed Forces. It is alleged by some that the CIA "paid key members of the coup regime forces, identified as drug traffickers, for information from the mid-1980s at least until the coup." Coup leaders Raoul Cédras and Michel François had received military training in the United States.

1992–1996: Iraq 
The CIA launched DBACHILLES, a coup d'état operation against the Iraqi government, recruiting Ayad Allawi, who headed the Iraqi National Accord, a network of Iraqis who opposed the Saddam Hussein government, as part of the operation. The network included Iraqi military and intelligence officers but was penetrated by people loyal to the Iraqi government. Also using Ayad Allawi and his network, the CIA directed a government sabotage and bombing campaign in Baghdad between 1992 and 1995. The CIA bombing campaign may have been merely a test of the operational capacity of the CIA's network of assets on the ground and not intended to be the launch of the coup strike itself. However, Allawi attempted a coup against Saddam Hussein in 1996. The coup was unsuccessful, but Ayad Allawi was later installed as prime minister of Iraq by the Iraq Interim Governing Council, which had been created by the U.S.-led coalition following the March 2003 invasion and occupation of Iraq.

1994–1995: Haiti 

After a right-wing military junta took over Haiti in 1991 in a coup, the U.S. initially had good relations with them. George H. W. Bush's administration supported the right wing junta; however, after the 1992 U.S. general election Bill Clinton came to power. Clinton was supportive of returning Jean-Bertrand Aristide to power, and his administration was active for the return of democracy to Haiti. This culminated in United Nations Security Council Resolution 940, which authorized the United States to lead an invasion of Haiti and restore Aristide to power. A diplomatic effort was led by former U.S. president Jimmy Carter. Then the U.S. gave the Haitian government an ultimatum: either the dictator of Haiti, Raoul Cedras, retire peacefully and let Aristide come back to power, or be invaded and forced out. Cedras capitulated; however, he did not immediately disband the armed forces. Protesters fought the military and police. The U.S. sent in the military to stop the violence, and soon it was quelled. Aristide returned to lead the country in October 1994. Clinton and him presided over ceremonies and Operation Uphold Democracy officially ended on March 31, 1995.

1996–1997: Zaire 

Due to the end of the Cold War, US support for Mobutu Sese Seko in Zaire reduced.  In 1990 the Rwandan Patriotic Front (FPR) invaded Rwanda, beginning the Rwandan Civil War, which culminated in the Rwandan genocide against the Tutsis and caused over 1.5 million refugees to flee into Zaire, where fighting broke out between refugee and non-refugee Tutsis, Hutu refugees, and other ethnic groups. In response, Rwanda formed Tutsi militias in Zaire, causing tensions between the militias and the Zaire government leading to the Banyamulenge Rebellion on  August 31, 1996, which led to the creation of Tutsi and non-Tutsi militias opposed to Mobutu into the Alliance of Democratic Forces for the Liberation of the Congo (AFDL), led by Laurent-Desire Kabila.

The United States covertly supported Rwanda before and during the Congo war. The U.S. believed it was time for "new generation of African leaders", such as Kagame and Yoweri Museveni in Uganda, which was part of the reason the U.S. had previously stopped supporting Mobutu. The U.S. sent soldiers to train the FPR and brought FPR commanders to the U.S as well before the war in 1995 for training. During the war, rebels in Bukavu were joined by a group of African–American mercenaries, who claimed they had been recruited in an unofficial U.S. mission. The CIA and U.S. army set up communications in Uganda, and during the war, several aircraft landed in Kigali and Entebbe, claiming to be bringing "aid for the genocide victims"; however, it has been alleged they were bringing military and communication supplies for the FPR. At the same time, U.S. operated anti-Mobutu support from the International Rescue Committee (IRC).

2000s

2000: FR Yugoslavia 

Following issues regarding the results of the 2000 Yugoslavian general election, the U.S. State Department heavily supported opposition groups such as Otpor! through the supply of promotional material and consulting services via Quangos. United States involvement served to speed up and organize dissent through exposure, resources, moral and material encouragement, technological aid and professional advice. This campaign was one of the factors contributing to incumbent president's defeat in the 2000 Yugoslavian general election and subsequent Bulldozer Revolution which overthrew Milošević on October 5, 2000 after he refused to recognise the results of the election.

2001–2021: Afghanistan

Since 1996, Afghanistan had been under the control of the Taliban-led Islamic Emirate of Afghanistan, a largely unrecognized unitary Deobandi–Islamic theocratic emirate administered by shura councils. On October 7, 2001, four weeks after the 9/11 attacks by al-Qaeda, the United States invaded Afghanistan and began bombing al-Qaeda and Taliban targets. Under the Taliban regime, al-Qaeda had used Afghanistan to train and indoctrinate fighters at its own training camps, import weapons, coordinate with other jihadists, and plot terrorist actions. 10,000 to 20,000 men passed through al-Qaeda run camps before 9/11, most of whom went to fight for the Taliban, while a smaller number were inducted into al-Qaeda. Although none of the hijackers were of Afghan nationality, the attacks had been planned in Kandahar. George W. Bush said that the goal was to capture al-Qaeda leader Osama bin Laden and bring him to justice.

On October 11, four days after the bombing started, Bush claimed that it might stop if bin Laden were handed over to the U.S. by the Taliban, which had provided safe haven to al-Qaeda. "If you cough him up and his people today, then we'll reconsider what we are doing to your country," Bush told the Taliban. "You still have a second chance. Just bring him in, and bring his leaders and lieutenants and other thugs and criminals with him." On October 14, Bush turned down an offer from the Taliban to discuss sending bin Laden to a third country. Taliban leader Mullah Omar had previously refused to extradite bin Laden. The United Kingdom was a key ally of the United States, offering support for military action from the start of preparations for the invasion, and the two countries worked with anti-Taliban Afghan forces in the Northern Alliance. The US aimed to destroy al-Qaeda and remove the Taliban regime from power, but also sought to prevent the Northern Alliance from taking control of Afghanistan, believing the Alliance's rule would alienate the country's Pashtun majority. CIA director George Tenet argued that the US should target al-Qaeda but "hold off on the Taliban," since the Taliban were popular in Pakistan and attacking them could jeopardize relations with Pakistan.

By the end of October, a further goal had emerged: to remove the Taliban from power in Afghanistan.

From December 6–17, 2001, a team of Northern Alliance fighters, under direction from a U.S. special forces team, pursued bin Laden in the cave complex of Tora Bora in eastern Afghanistan, but the U.S. did not commit its own troops to the operation and bin Laden escaped to neighbouring Pakistan. That same month, the Taliban Islamic Emirate of Afghanistan fell  and was replaced by the Afghan Interim Administration and then the Transitional Islamic State of Afghanistan in 2002, and finally the Islamic Republic of Afghanistan in 2004. Bin Laden was killed by a team of United States Navy SEALs in a raid on his clandestine residence in Abbottabad, Pakistan, in May 2011, nearly ten years after the initial invasion. Despite bin Laden's death, the U.S. remained in Afghanistan, propping up the governments of Hamid Karzai and Ashraf Ghani.
	
President Donald Trump struck an arrangement with the Taliban in February 2020 that would see U.S. troops withdraw from Afghanistan. In April 2021, his successor, Joe Biden announced that a full withdrawal would occur in August of that year. This was followed by the return of the Taliban to power.

2003–2021: Iraq

In 1998 as a non-covert measure, the U.S. enacted the "Iraq Liberation Act," which states, in part, that "It should be the policy of the United States to support efforts to remove the regime headed by Saddam Hussein from power in Iraq," and appropriated funds for U.S. aid "to the Iraqi democratic opposition organizations." After Bush was elected he started being more aggressive toward Iraq. After the 9/11 attacks the Bush administration claimed that Iraq's ruler at the time, Saddam Hussein, had connections to Al-Qaeda and was supporting terrorism. The administration also stated that Hussein was covertly continuing production of weapons of mass destruction despite the fact that evidence for both was not conclusive. Iraq was also one of the three countries Bush called out in his Axis of Evil Speech. In 2002 Congress passed the "Iraq Resolution" which authorized the president to "use any means necessary" against Iraq. The Iraq War then began in March 2003 when United States-led military coalition invaded the country and overthrew the Iraqi government. The U.S. captured and helped prosecute Hussein, who was later hanged. The U.S. and the new Iraqi government also fought an insurgency following the invasion. In December 2011 the U.S. withdrew its soldiers from the conflict, but returned in 2014 to help stop the rise of the Islamic State of Iraq and the Levant (ISIL). The military's combat mission came to an end on December 9, 2021.

2005: Kyrgyzstan 

In Kyrgyzstan, in response to the corruption and authoritarianism of the Askar Akayev government which had ruled since 1990, mass protests ousted the government and free elections were held.

According to The Wall Street Journal, the US government provided aid to opposition protesters via the State Department, USAID, Radio Liberty and Freedom House by funding the only print-media outlet in the country not controlled by the government. When the state cut off electricity to the outlet, the U.S. embassy provided emergency generators. Other opposition groups and an opposition TV station received funding from the US government and US-based NGOs.

2006–2007: Palestinian Territories 

The Bush Administration was displeased with the government formed by Hamas, which won 56 percent of the seats in the Palestinian legislative election of 2006. The U.S. government pressured the Fatah faction of the Palestinian National Authority leadership to topple the Hamas government of Prime Minister Ismail Haniyeh, and provided funding, including a secret training and armaments program that received tens of millions of dollars in congressional funding. This funding was initially blocked by Congress, who feared that arms provided to Palestinians might later be used against Israel, but the Bush administration circumvented Congress.

Fatah launched a war against the Haniyeh government. When the government of Saudi Arabia attempted to negotiate a truce between the sides so as to avoid a wide-scale Palestinian civil war, the U.S. government pressured Fatah to reject the Saudi plan and to continue the effort to topple the Hamas government. Ultimately, the Hamas government was prevented from ruling over all of the Palestinian territories, with Fatah retreating to the West Bank and Hamas retreating to and taking control of the Gaza strip.

2005–2009: Syria 

In 2005, after a period of co-operation in the War on Terror, the Bush administration froze relations with Syria. According to US cables released by WikiLeaks, the State Department then began to funnel money to opposition groups, including at least $6 million to the anti-government satellite channel Barada TV and the exile group Movement for Justice and Development in Syria, although this was denied by the channel. This covert backing continued under the Obama administration until at least April 2009 when US diplomats expressed concern the funding would undermine US attempts to rebuild relations with Syrian President Bashar Al-Assad.

2010s

2011: Libya 

In 2011, Libya had been led by Muammar Gaddafi since 1969. In February 2011, amid the "Arab Spring", a revolution broke out against him, spreading from the second city Benghazi (where an interim government was set up on 27 February), to the capital Tripoli, sparking the First Libyan Civil War. On 17 March, United Nations Security Council Resolution 1973 was adopted, authorizing a no-fly zone over Libya, and "all necessary measures" to protect civilians. Two days later, France, the United States and the United Kingdom launched the 2011 military intervention in Libya with Operation Odyssey Dawn, US and British naval forces firing over 110 Tomahawk cruise missiles, the French and British Air Forces undertaking sorties across Libya and a naval blockade by Coalition forces. A coalition of 27 states from Europe and the Middle East soon joined the NATO-led intervention, as Operation Unified Protector. The Gaddafi government collapsed in August, leaving the National Transitional Council as the de facto government, with UN recognition. Gaddafi was captured and killed in October by National Transitional Council forces and NATO action ceased.

In April 2016, U.S. President Barack Obama said that the "worst mistake" of his presidency was "failing to plan for the day after, what I think was the right thing to do, in intervening in Libya."

2012–2017: Syria 

In April 2011, after the outbreak of the Syrian civil war in early 2011, three U.S. Senators, Republicans John McCain and Lindsey Graham and Independent Joe Lieberman, urged President Barack Obama in a joint statement to "state unequivocally" that "it is time to go" for President Bashar al-Assad. In August, 2011, the U.S. government called on Assad to "step aside" and imposed an oil embargo against the Syrian government. Starting in 2013, the U.S. provided training, weapons, and money to vetted moderate Syrian rebels, and in 2014, the Supreme Military Council. In 2015, Obama reaffirmed that "Assad must go".

In March 2017, Ambassador Nikki Haley told a group of reporters that the US's priority in Syria was no longer on "getting Assad out." Earlier that day at a news conference in Ankara, Secretary of State Rex Tillerson also said that the "longer term status of President Assad will be decided by the Syrian people." While the US Defense Department's program to aid predominantly Kurdish rebels fighting the Islamic State of Iraq and the Levant (ISIL) continued, it was revealed in July 2017 that US President Donald Trump had ordered a "phasing out" of the CIA's support for anti-Assad rebels.

See also 

 Criticism of United States foreign policy
 Foreign electoral intervention
 Foreign interventions by the United States
 Latin America–United States relations
 Russian involvement in regime change
 Soviet involvement in regime change
 Timeline of United States military operations
 United States involvement in regime change in Latin America 
 Assassinations and targeted killing by the CIA

Notes

Bibliography

Further reading

 Downes, Alexander B. (2021). Catastrophic Success: Why Foreign-Imposed Regime Change Goes Wrong. Cornell University Press.
.

 
Politics of the United States
United States foreign policy